Lucy Caroline Cavendish, also known as Lady Frederick Cavendish ( Lyttelton; 5 September 1841 – 22 April 1925), was a pioneer of women's education.

A daughter of George Lyttelton, 4th Baron Lyttelton, she married into another aristocratic family, the Cavendishes, in 1864. Eighteen years later her husband, Lord Frederick Cavendish, was murdered in Dublin by Irish republicans (a victim of the Phoenix Park murders). After his death she devoted much of her time to the cause of girls' and women's education, for which she was honoured in her lifetime with an honorary degree, and posthumously when, in 1965, Cambridge University named its first post-graduate college for women after her.

Biography
Lucy Lyttelton was born at Hagley Hall in Worcestershire, the second daughter of George Lyttelton, 4th Baron Lyttelton, and his wife, Mary Glynne, whose sister married William Ewart Gladstone. In 1863 she was appointed a Maid of Honour to Queen Victoria, whom she attended until her marriage the following year.

Marriage and husband's murder
On 7 June 1864 she married Lord Frederick Cavendish, the second son of the Duke of Devonshire. They had no children. Cavendish was elected to Parliament in 1865. In the same year she was excited to join the Ladies Diocesan Association run by Catharine Tait with the prospect of visiting workhouses to try to bridge the gap between the rich and the poor.

Her husband was murdered by Irish republicans on 6 May 1882, the same day he took the oath of office of Chief Secretary for Ireland. Although devastated by the assassination, on the day before the ringleader was hanged she sent him the small gold crucifix she had long worn, as a token of her forgiveness. Gladstone was greatly moved when she told him that she could bear the loss of her beloved husband "if his death were to work good to his fellow-men, which indeed was the whole object of his life." She remained a firm supporter of Irish Home Rule. A window to Lord Cavendish's memory was placed in St Margaret's Church, Westminster, at the expense of the members of the House of Commons.

Later years
After Cavendish's death, Lucy Cavendish was active in the sphere of women's education. She was President of the Yorkshire Ladies Council of Education from 1883 to 1912. She declined the offer of the post of Mistress of Girton College, Cambridge, in 1884. She was a member of the Royal Commission on Secondary Education and was a founding member of the Council of the Girls' Public Day School Company, which had been founded by her father. On 6 October 1904 she received the honorary degree of Doctor of Laws at the formal inauguration of Leeds University for "notable service to the cause of education".

Death
Lucy Cavendish died on 22 April 1925, aged 83, in her home, the Glebe, in Penshurst, Kent. She was buried with her husband in the Cavendish family churchyard, St Peter's.

Legacy
Lucy Cavendish College, Cambridge, was named in her honour in 1965. She was the great-aunt of one of its founders, Margaret Braithwaite.

Notes

References

External links
The Diary of Lady Frederick Cavendish (or Lady Lucy Cavendish) (blog) Edited by John Bailey with illustrations Vol. I and II, New York, Frederick A. Stokes Company Publishers, First Edition 1927

1841 births
1925 deaths
Lucy Cavendish
Lucy Cavendish College, Cambridge
Lucy Caroline Lyttelton
British maids of honour
Daughters of barons
Presidents of the Girls' Day School Trust
19th-century English women
20th-century English women
20th-century English people
19th-century English educators
20th-century English educators
National Council of Women of Great Britain members